Fascism is a far-right, authoritarian, ultranationalist political ideology and movement, characterized by a dictatorial leader, centralized autocracy, militarism, forcible suppression of opposition, belief in a natural social hierarchy, subordination of individual interests for the perceived good of the nation and race, and strong regimentation of society and the economy.

Fascism rose to prominence in early 20th-century Europe. The first fascist movements emerged in Italy during World War I, before spreading to other European countries, most notably Germany. Fascism also had adherents outside of Europe. Opposed to anarchism, democracy, pluralism, liberalism, socialism, and Marxism, fascism is placed on the far-right wing within the traditional left–right spectrum.

Fascists saw World War I as a revolution that brought massive changes to the nature of war, society, the state, and technology. The advent of total war and the mass mobilization of society erased the distinction between civilians and combatants. A military citizenship arose in which all citizens were involved with the military in some manner. The war resulted in the rise of a powerful state capable of mobilizing millions of people to serve on the front lines and providing logistics to support them, as well as having unprecedented authority to intervene in the lives of citizens.

Fascism rejects assertions that violence is inherently bad and views imperialism, political violence and war as means to national rejuvenation. Fascists often advocate for the establishment of a totalitarian one-party state, and for a dirigiste economy, with the principal goal of achieving autarky (national economic self-sufficiency) through protectionist and economic interventionist policies. Fascism's extreme authoritarianism and nationalism often manifests as belief in racial purity or a master race, usually blended with some variant of racism or bigotry against a demonized "Other", such as Jews. These ideas have motivated fascist regimes to commit genocides, massacres, forced sterilizations, mass killings, and forced deportations.

Since the end of World War II in 1945, few parties have openly described themselves as fascist; the term is more often used pejoratively by political opponents. The descriptions of neo-fascist or post-fascist are sometimes employed to describe contemporary parties with ideologies similar to, or rooted in, 20th-century fascist movements. Some opposition groups have adopted the label anti-fascist or antifa to signify their stance.

Etymology 
This was the name given to political organizations in Italy known as fasci, groups similar to guilds or syndicates. According to Italian fascist dictator Benito Mussolini's own account, the Fasces of Revolutionary Action were founded in Italy in 1915. In 1919, Mussolini founded the Italian Fasces of Combat in Milan, which became the National Fascist Party two years later.

The symbolism of the fasces suggested strength through unity: a single rod is easily broken, while the bundle is difficult to break. Similar symbols were developed by different fascist movements: for example, the Falange symbol is five arrows joined by a yoke.

Definitions 

Historians, political scientists, and other scholars have long debated the exact nature of fascism. Historian Ian Kershaw once wrote that "trying to define 'fascism' is like trying to nail jelly to the wall." Each different group described as fascist has at least some unique elements, and many definitions of fascism have been criticized as either too broad or too narrow. According to many scholars, fascism—especially once in power—has historically attacked communism, conservatism, and parliamentary liberalism, attracting support primarily from the far-right. Frequently cited as a standard definition by notable scholars, such as Roger Griffin, Randall Schweller, Bo Rothstein, Federico Finchelstein, and Stephen D. Shenfield, is that of historian Stanley G. Payne.

Payne's definition of fascism focuses on three concepts:
 "Fascist negations" – anti-liberalism, anti-communism, and anti-conservatism.
 "Fascist goals" – the creation of a nationalist dictatorship to regulate economic structure and to transform social relations within a modern, self-determined culture, and the expansion of the nation into an empire.
 "Fascist style" – a political aesthetic of romantic symbolism, mass mobilization, a positive view of violence, and promotion of masculinity, youth, and charismatic authoritarian leadership.

In his book How Fascism Works: The Politics of Us and Them, Jason Stanley defined fascism as "a cult of the leader who promises national restoration in the face of humiliation brought on by supposed communists, Marxists and minorities and immigrants who are supposedly posing a threat to the character and the history of a nation." and that "The leader proposes that only he can solve it and all of his political opponents are enemies or traitors." Stanley says recent global events , including the COVID-19 pandemic and the 2020–2022 United States racial unrest, have substantiated his concern about how fascist rhetoric is showing up in politics and policies around the world. Historian John Lukacs argues that there is no such thing as generic fascism. He claims that Nazism and communism are essentially manifestations of populism and that states such as Nazi Germany and Fascist Italy are more different than similar. Roger Griffin describes fascism as "a genus of political ideology whose mythic core in its various permutations is a palingenetic form of populist ultranationalism." Griffin describes the ideology as having three core components: "(i) the rebirth myth, (ii) populist ultra-nationalism, and (iii) the myth of decadence." In Griffin's view, fascism is "a genuinely revolutionary, trans-class form of anti-liberal, and in the last analysis, anti-conservative nationalism" built on a complex range of theoretical and cultural influences. He distinguishes an inter-war period in which it manifested itself in elite-led but populist "armed party" politics opposing socialism and liberalism, and promising radical politics to rescue the nation from decadence. Kershaw argues that the difference between fascism and other forms of right-wing authoritarianism in the Interwar period is that the latter generally aimed "to conserve the existing social order", whereas fascism was "revolutionary", seeking to change society and obtain "total commitment" from the population.

In Against the Fascist Creep, Alexander Reid Ross writes regarding Griffin's view: "Following the Cold War and shifts in fascist organizing techniques, a number of scholars have moved toward the minimalist 'new consensus' refined by Roger Griffin: 'the mythic core' of fascism is 'a populist form of palingenetic ultranationalism.' That means that fascism is an ideology that draws on old, ancient, and even arcane myths of racial, cultural, ethnic, and national origins to develop a plan for the 'new man. Griffin himself explored this 'mythic' or 'eliminable' core of fascism with his concept of post-fascism to explore the continuation of Nazism in the modern era. Additionally, other historians have applied this minimalist core to explore proto-fascist movements.

Cas Mudde and Cristóbal Rovira Kaltwasser argue that although fascism "flirted with populism ... in an attempt to generate mass support", it is better seen as an elitist ideology. They cite in particular its exaltation of the Leader, the race, and the state, rather than the people. They see populism as a "thin-centered ideology" with a "restricted morphology" that necessarily becomes attached to "thick-centered" ideologies such as fascism, liberalism, or socialism. Thus populism can be found as an aspect of many specific ideologies, without necessarily being a defining characteristic of those ideologies. They refer to the combination of populism, authoritarianism and ultranationalism as "a marriage of convenience".

Robert Paxton says: "[fascism is] a form of political behavior marked by obsessive preoccupation with community decline, humiliation, or victimhood and by compensatory cults of unity, energy, and purity, in which a mass-based party of committed nationalist militants, working in uneasy but effective collaboration with traditional elites, abandons democratic liberties and pursues with redemptive violence and without ethical or legal restraints goals of internal cleansing and external expansion." Roger Eatwell defines fascism as "an ideology that strives to forge social rebirth based on a holistic-national radical Third Way", while Walter Laqueur sees the core tenets of fascism as "self-evident: nationalism; social Darwinism; racialism, the need for leadership, a new aristocracy, and obedience; and the negation of the ideals of the Enlightenment and the French Revolution."

Historian Emilio Gentile has defined fascism as "a modern political phenomenon, revolutionary, anti-liberal and anti-Marxist, organized in a militia party with a totalitarian conception of politics and the State, an activist and anti-theoretical ideology, with a mythical, virilistic and anti-hedonistic foundation, sacralized as a secular religion, which affirms the absolute primacy of the nation, understood as an ethnically homogeneous organic community, hierarchically organized in a corporate state, with a bellicose vocation to the politics of greatness, power and conquest aimed at creating a new order and a new civilization".

Racism was a key feature of German fascism, for which the Holocaust was a high priority. According to The Historiography of Genocide, "In dealing with the Holocaust, it is the consensus of historians that Nazi Germany targeted Jews as a race, not as a religious group." Umberto Eco, Kevin Passmore, John Weiss, Ian Adams, and Moyra Grant stress racism as a characteristic component of German fascism. Kershaw noted that common factors of fascism included "the ‘cleansing’ of all those deemed not to belong – foreigners, ethnic minorities, 'undesirables'" and belief in its own nation's superiority, even if it was not biological racism like in Nazism. Fascist philosophies vary by application, but remain distinct by one theoretical commonality: all traditionally fall into the far-right sector of any political spectrum, catalyzed by afflicted class identities over conventional social inequities.

Position in the political spectrum 

Scholars place fascism on the far-right of the political spectrum. Such scholarship focuses on its social conservatism and its authoritarian means of opposing egalitarianism. Roderick Stackelberg places fascism—including Nazism, which he says is "a radical variant of fascism"—on the political right by explaining: "The more a person deems absolute equality among all people to be a desirable condition, the further left he or she will be on the ideological spectrum. The more a person considers inequality to be unavoidable or even desirable, the further to the right he or she will be."

Fascism's origins are complex and include many seemingly contradictory viewpoints, ultimately centered on a mythos of national rebirth from decadence. Fascism was founded during World War I by Italian national syndicalists who drew upon both left-wing organizational tactics and right-wing political views. Italian Fascism gravitated to the right in the early 1920s. A major element of fascist ideology that has been deemed to be far right is its stated goal to promote the right of a supposedly superior people to dominate, while purging society of supposedly inferior elements.

In the 1920s, the Italian Fascists described their ideology as right-wing in the political program The Doctrine of Fascism, stating: "We are free to believe that this is the century of authority, a century tending to the 'right,' a fascist century." Mussolini stated that fascism's position on the political spectrum was not a serious issue for fascists: "fascism, sitting on the right, could also have sat on the mountain of the center. ... These words in any case do not have a fixed and unchanged meaning: they do have a variable subject to location, time and spirit. We don't give a damn about these empty terminologies and we despise those who are terrorized by these words."

Major Italian groups politically on the right, especially rich landowners and big business, feared an uprising by groups on the left, such as sharecroppers and labour unions. They welcomed fascism and supported its violent suppression of opponents on the left. The accommodation of the political right into the Italian Fascist movement in the early 1920s created internal factions within the movement. The "Fascist left" included Michele Bianchi, Giuseppe Bottai, Angelo Oliviero Olivetti, Sergio Panunzio, and Edmondo Rossoni, who were committed to advancing national syndicalism as a replacement for parliamentary liberalism in order to modernize the economy and advance the interests of workers and the common people. The "fascist right" included members of the paramilitary Blackshirts and former members of the Italian Nationalist Association (ANI). The Blackshirts wanted to establish fascism as a complete dictatorship, while the former ANI members, including Alfredo Rocco, sought to institute an authoritarian corporatist state to replace the liberal state in Italy while retaining the existing elites. Upon accommodating the political right, there arose a group of monarchist fascists who sought to use fascism to create an absolute monarchy under King Victor Emmanuel III of Italy.

After the fall of the Fascist regime in Italy, when King Victor Emmanuel III forced Mussolini to resign as head of government and placed him under arrest in 1943, Mussolini was rescued by German forces. While continuing to rely on Germany for support, Mussolini and the remaining loyal Fascists founded the Italian Social Republic with Mussolini as head of state. Mussolini sought to re-radicalize Italian Fascism, declaring that the fascist state had been overthrown because Italian fascism had been subverted by Italian conservatives and the bourgeoisie. Then the new fascist government proposed the creation of workers' councils and profit-sharing in industry, although the German authorities, who effectively controlled northern Italy at this point, ignored these measures and did not seek to enforce them.

A number of post-World War II fascist movements described themselves as a Third Position outside the traditional political spectrum. Falange Española de las JONS leader José Antonio Primo de Rivera said: "[B]asically the Right stands for the maintenance of an economic structure, albeit an unjust one, while the Left stands for the attempt to subvert that economic structure, even though the subversion thereof would entail the destruction of much that was worthwhile."

Fascist as a pejorative 

The term fascist has been used as a pejorative, regarding varying movements across the far right of the political spectrum. George Orwell noted in 1944 that the term had been used to denigrate diverse positions "in internal politics": while fascism is "a political and economic system" that was inconvenient to define, "as used, the word 'Fascism' is almost entirely meaningless. ... almost any English person would accept 'bully' as a synonym for 'Fascist,, and in 1946 wrote that "...'Fascism' has now no meaning except in so far as it signifies something not desirable."

Despite fascist movements' history of anti-communism, Communist states have sometimes been referred to as fascist, typically as an insult. It has been applied to Marxist–Leninist regimes in Cuba under Fidel Castro and Vietnam under Ho Chi Minh. Chinese Marxists used the term to denounce the Soviet Union during the Sino-Soviet split, and the Soviets used the term to denounce Chinese Marxists and social democracy, coining a new term in social fascism.

In the United States, Herbert Matthews of The New York Times asked in 1946: "Should we now place Stalinist Russia in the same category as Hitlerite Germany? Should we say that she is Fascist?" J. Edgar Hoover, longtime FBI director and ardent anti-communist, wrote extensively of red fascism. The Ku Klux Klan in the 1920s was sometimes called fascist. Historian Peter Amann states that, "Undeniably, the Klan had some traits in common with European fascism—chauvinism, racism, a mystique of violence, an affirmation of a certain kind of archaic traditionalism—yet their differences were fundamental ... [the KKK] never envisioned a change of political or economic system."

Richard Griffiths of the University of Wales wrote in 2005 that "fascism" is the "most misused, and over-used word, of our times." "Fascist" is sometimes applied to post-World War II organizations and ways of thinking that academics more commonly term neo-fascist.

History

Background and 19th-century roots 
Georges Valois, founder of the first non-Italian fascist party Faisceau, claimed the roots of fascism stemmed from the late 18th century Jacobin movement, seeing in its totalitarian nature a foreshadowing of the fascist state. Historian George Mosse similarly analyzed fascism as an inheritor of the mass ideology and civil religion of the French Revolution, as well as a result of the brutalization of societies in 1914–1918.

Historians such as Irene Collins and Howard C Payne see Napoleon III, who ran a 'police state' and suppressed the media, as a forerunner of fascism. According to David Thomson, the Italian Risorgimento of 1871 led to the 'nemesis of fascism'. William L Shirer sees a continuity from the views of Fichte and Hegel, through Bismarck, to Hitler; Robert Gerwarth speaks of a 'direct line' from Bismarck to Hitler. Julian Dierkes sees fascism as a 'particularly violent form of imperialism'.

era and fusion of Maurrasism with Sorelianism (1880–1914) 

The historian Zeev Sternhell has traced the ideological roots of fascism back to the 1880s and in particular to the  theme of that time. The theme was based on a revolt against materialism, rationalism, positivism, bourgeois society, and democracy. The  generation supported emotionalism, irrationalism, subjectivism and vitalism. They regarded civilization as being in crisis, requiring a massive and total solution. Their intellectual school considered the individual as only one part of the larger collectivity, which should not be viewed as a numerical sum of atomized individuals. They condemned the rationalistic, liberal individualism of society and the dissolution of social links in bourgeois society.

The  outlook was influenced by various intellectual developments, including Darwinian biology, Arthur de Gobineau's racialism, Gustave Le Bon's psychology, and the philosophies of Friedrich Nietzsche, Fyodor Dostoyevsky, and Henri Bergson. Social Darwinism, which gained widespread acceptance, made no distinction between physical and social life, and viewed the human condition as being an unceasing struggle to achieve the survival of the fittest. It challenged positivism's claim of deliberate and rational choice as the determining behaviour of humans, with social Darwinism focusing on heredity, race, and environment. Its emphasis on biogroup identity and the role of organic relations within societies fostered the legitimacy and appeal of nationalism. New theories of social and political psychology also rejected the notion of human behaviour being governed by rational choice and instead claimed that emotion was more influential in political issues than reason.

In his work The Ruling Class (1896), Gaetano Mosca developed the theory that claims that in all societies an "organized minority" would dominate and rule over an "disorganized majority", stating that there are only two classes in society, "the governing" (the organized minority) and "the governed" (the disorganized majority). He claims that the organized nature of the organized minority makes it irresistible to any individual of the disorganized majority.

French nationalist and reactionary monarchist Charles Maurras influenced fascism. Maurras promoted what he called integral nationalism, which called for the organic unity of a nation, and insisted that a powerful monarch was an ideal leader of a nation. Maurras distrusted what he considered the democratic mystification of the popular will that created an impersonal collective subject. He claimed that a powerful monarch was a personified sovereign who could exercise authority to unite a nation's people. Maurras' integral nationalism was idealized by fascists, but modified into a modernized revolutionary form that was devoid of Maurras' monarchism.

Fascist syndicalism 

French revolutionary syndicalist Georges Sorel promoted the legitimacy of political violence in his work Reflections on Violence (1908) and other works in which he advocated radical syndicalist action to achieve a revolution to overthrow capitalism and the bourgeoisie through a general strike. In Reflections on Violence, Sorel emphasized need for a revolutionary political religion. Also in his work The Illusions of Progress, Sorel denounced democracy as reactionary, saying "nothing is more aristocratic than democracy." By 1909, after the failure of a syndicalist general strike in France, Sorel and his supporters left the radical left and went to the radical right, where they sought to merge militant Catholicism and French patriotism with their views—advocating anti-republican Christian French patriots as ideal revolutionaries. Initially, Sorel had officially been a revisionist of Marxism, but by 1910 announced his abandonment of socialist literature and claimed in 1914, using an aphorism of Benedetto Croce that "socialism is dead" because of the "decomposition of Marxism". Sorel became a supporter of reactionary Maurrassian nationalism beginning in 1909 that influenced his works. Maurras held interest in merging his nationalist ideals with Sorelian syndicalism, known as Sorelianism, as a means to confront democracy. Maurras stated that "a socialism liberated from the democratic and cosmopolitan element fits nationalism well as a well made glove fits a beautiful hand."

The fusion of Maurrassian nationalism and Sorelian syndicalism influenced radical Italian nationalist Enrico Corradini. Corradini spoke of the need for a nationalist-syndicalist movement, led by elitist aristocrats and anti-democrats who shared a revolutionary syndicalist commitment to direct action and a willingness to fight. Corradini spoke of Italy as being a "proletarian nation" that needed to pursue imperialism in order to challenge the "plutocratic" French and British. Corradini's views were part of a wider set of perceptions within the right-wing Italian Nationalist Association (ANI), which claimed that Italy's economic backwardness was caused by corruption in its political class, liberalism, and division caused by "ignoble socialism".

The ANI held ties and influence among conservatives, Catholics, and the business community. Italian national syndicalists held a common set of principles: the rejection of bourgeois values, democracy, liberalism, Marxism, internationalism, and pacifism, and the promotion of heroism, vitalism, and violence. The ANI claimed that liberal democracy was no longer compatible with the modern world, and advocated a strong state and imperialism. They believed that humans are naturally predatory, and that nations are in a constant struggle in which only the strongest would survive.

Futurism was both an artistic-cultural movement and initially a political movement in Italy led by Filippo Tommaso Marinetti who founded the Manifesto of Futurism (1908), that championed the causes of modernism, action, and political violence as necessary elements of politics while denouncing liberalism and parliamentary politics. Marinetti rejected conventional democracy based on majority rule and egalitarianism, for a new form of democracy, promoting what he described in his work "The Futurist Conception of Democracy" as the following: "We are therefore able to give the directions to create and to dismantle to numbers, to quantity, to the mass, for with us number, quantity and mass will never be—as they are in Germany and Russia—the number, quantity and mass of mediocre men, incapable and indecisive."

Futurism influenced fascism in its emphasis on recognizing the virile nature of violent action and war as being necessities of modern civilization. Marinetti promoted the need of physical training of young men saying that, in male education, gymnastics should take precedence over books. He advocated segregation of the genders because womanly sensibility must not enter men's education, which he claimed must be "lively, bellicose, muscular and violently dynamic."

World War I and its aftermath (1914–1929) 

At the outbreak of World War I in August 1914, the Italian political left became severely split over its position on the war. The Italian Socialist Party (PSI) opposed the war but a number of Italian revolutionary syndicalists supported war against Germany and Austria-Hungary on the grounds that their reactionary regimes had to be defeated to ensure the success of socialism. Angelo Oliviero Olivetti formed a pro-interventionist fascio called the Revolutionary Fasces of International Action in October 1914. Benito Mussolini upon being expelled from his position as chief editor of the PSI's newspaper  for his anti-German stance, joined the interventionist cause in a separate fascio. The term "fascism" was first used in 1915 by members of Mussolini's movement, the Fasces of Revolutionary Action.

The first meeting of the Fasces of Revolutionary Action was held on 24 January 1915 when Mussolini declared that it was necessary for Europe to resolve its national problems—including national borders—of Italy and elsewhere "for the ideals of justice and liberty for which oppressed peoples must acquire the right to belong to those national communities from which they descended." Attempts to hold mass meetings were ineffective and the organization was regularly harassed by government authorities and socialists.

Similar political ideas arose in Germany after the outbreak of the war. German sociologist Johann Plenge spoke of the rise of a "National Socialism" in Germany within what he termed the "ideas of 1914" that were a declaration of war against the "ideas of 1789" (the French Revolution). According to Plenge, the "ideas of 1789"—such as the rights of man, democracy, individualism and liberalism—were being rejected in favor of "the ideas of 1914" that included "German values" of duty, discipline, law and order. Plenge believed that racial solidarity would replace class division and that "racial comrades" would unite to create a socialist society in the struggle of "proletarian" Germany against "capitalist" Britain. He believed that the Spirit of 1914 manifested itself in the concept of the People's League of National Socialism. This National Socialism was a form of state socialism that rejected the "idea of boundless freedom" and promoted an economy that would serve the whole of Germany under the leadership of the state. This National Socialism was opposed to capitalism because of the components that were against "the national interest" of Germany but insisted that National Socialism would strive for greater efficiency in the economy. Plenge advocated an authoritarian rational ruling elite to develop National Socialism through a hierarchical technocratic state.

Impact of World War I 

Fascists viewed World War I as bringing revolutionary changes in the nature of war, society, the state and technology, as the advent of total war and mass mobilization had broken down the distinction between civilian and combatant, as civilians had become a critical part in economic production for the war effort and thus arose a "military citizenship" in which all citizens were involved to the military in some manner during the war. World War I had resulted in the rise of a powerful state capable of mobilizing millions of people to serve on the front lines or provide economic production and logistics to support those on the front lines, as well as having unprecedented authority to intervene in the lives of citizens. Fascists viewed technological developments of weaponry and the state's total mobilization of its population in the war as symbolizing the beginning of a new era fusing state power with mass politics, technology and particularly the mobilizing myth that they contended had triumphed over the myth of progress and the era of liberalism.

Impact of the Bolshevik Revolution 
The October Revolution of 1917, in which Bolshevik communists led by Vladimir Lenin seized power in Russia, greatly influenced the development of fascism. In 1917, Mussolini, as leader of the Fasces of Revolutionary Action, praised the October Revolution, but later he became unimpressed with Lenin, regarding him as merely a new version of Tsar Nicholas II. After World War I, fascists commonly campaigned on anti-Marxist agendas.

Liberal opponents of both fascism and the Bolsheviks argue that there are various similarities between the two, including that they believed in the necessity of a vanguard leadership, had disdain for bourgeois values, and it is argued had totalitarian ambitions. In practice, both have commonly emphasized revolutionary action, proletarian nation theories, one-party states, and party-armies; however, both draw clear distinctions from each other both in aims and tactics, with the Bolsheviks emphasizing the need for an organized participatory democracy (Soviet democracy) and an egalitarian, internationalist vision for society based on proletarian internationalism, while fascists emphasized hyper-nationalism and open hostility towards democracy, envisioning a hierarchical social structure as essential to their aims. With the antagonism between anti-interventionist Marxists and pro-interventionist fascists complete by the end of the war, the two sides became irreconcilable. The fascists presented themselves as anti-communists and as especially opposed to the Marxists.

Fascist Manifesto and Charter of Carnaro 
In 1919, Alceste De Ambris and futurist movement leader Filippo Tommaso Marinetti created "The Manifesto of the Italian Fasces of Combat". The Fascist Manifesto was presented on 6 June 1919 in the fascist newspaper  and supported the creation of universal suffrage, including women's suffrage (the latter being realized only partly in late 1925, with all opposition parties banned or disbanded); proportional representation on a regional basis; government representation through a corporatist system of "National Councils" of experts, selected from professionals and tradespeople, elected to represent and hold legislative power over their respective areas, including labour, industry, transportation, public health, and communications, among others; and abolition of the Senate of the Kingdom of Italy. The Fascist Manifesto supported the creation of an eight-hour work day for all workers, a minimum wage, worker representation in industrial management, equal confidence in labour unions as in industrial executives and public servants, reorganization of the transportation sector, revision of the draft law on invalidity insurance, reduction of the retirement age from 65 to 55, a strong progressive tax on capital, confiscation of the property of religious institutions and abolishment of bishoprics, and revision of military contracts to allow the government to seize 85% of profits. It also called for the fulfillment of expansionist aims in the Balkans and other parts of the Mediterranean, the creation of a short-service national militia to serve defensive duties, nationalization of the armaments industry, and a foreign policy designed to be peaceful but also competitive.

The next events that influenced the fascists in Italy was the raid of Fiume by Italian nationalist Gabriele d'Annunzio and the founding of the Charter of Carnaro in 1920. D'Annunzio and De Ambris designed the Charter, which advocated national-syndicalist corporatist productionism alongside D'Annunzio's political views. Many fascists saw the Charter of Carnaro as an ideal constitution for a fascist Italy. This behaviour of aggression towards Yugoslavia and South Slavs was pursued by Italian fascists with their persecution of South Slavs—especially Slovenes and Croats.

From populism to conservative accommodations 
In 1920, militant strike activity by industrial workers reached its peak in Italy and 1919 and 1920 were known as the "Red Year". Mussolini and the fascists took advantage of the situation by allying with industrial businesses and attacking workers and peasants in the name of preserving order and internal peace in Italy.

Fascists identified their primary opponents as the majority of socialists on the left who had opposed intervention in World War I. The fascists and the Italian political right held common ground: both held Marxism in contempt, discounted class consciousness and believed in the rule of elites. The fascists assisted the anti-socialist campaign by allying with the other parties and the conservative right in a mutual effort to destroy the Italian Socialist Party and labour organizations committed to class identity above national identity.

Fascism sought to accommodate Italian conservatives by making major alterations to its political agenda—abandoning its previous populism, republicanism and anticlericalism, adopting policies in support of free enterprise and accepting the Catholic Church and the monarchy as institutions in Italy. To appeal to Italian conservatives, fascism adopted policies such as promoting family values, including policies designed to reduce the number of women in the workforce—limiting the woman's role to that of a mother. The fascists banned literature on birth control and increased penalties for abortion in 1926, declaring both crimes against the state.

Although fascism adopted a number of anti-modern positions designed to appeal to people upset with the new trends in sexuality and women's rights—especially those with a reactionary point of view—the fascists sought to maintain fascism's revolutionary character, with Angelo Oliviero Olivetti saying: "Fascism would like to be conservative, but it will [be] by being revolutionary." The Fascists supported revolutionary action and committed to secure law and order to appeal to both conservatives and syndicalists.

Prior to fascism's accommodations to the political right, fascism was a small, urban, northern Italian movement that had about a thousand members. After Fascism's accommodation of the political right, the fascist movement's membership soared to approximately 250,000 by 1921. A 2020 article by Daron Acemoğlu, Giuseppe De Feo, Giacomo De Luca, and Gianluca Russo in the Center for Economic and Policy Research, exploring the link between the threat of socialism and Mussolini's rise to power, found "a strong association between the Red Scare in Italy and the subsequent local support for the Fascist Party in the early 1920s." According to the authors, it was local elites and large landowners who played an important role in boosting Fascist Party activity and support, which did not come from socialists' core supporters but from centre-right voters, as they viewed traditional centre-right parties as ineffective in stopping socialism and turned to the Fascists. In 2003, historian Adrian Lyttelton wrote: "The expansion of Fascism in the rural areas was stimulated and directed by the reaction of the farmers and landowners against the peasant leagues of both Socialists and Catholics."

Fascist violence 
Beginning in 1922, fascist paramilitaries escalated their strategy from one of attacking socialist offices and the homes of socialist leadership figures, to one of violent occupation of cities. The fascists met little serious resistance from authorities and proceeded to take over several northern Italian cities. The fascists attacked the headquarters of socialist and Catholic labour unions in Cremona and imposed forced Italianization upon the German-speaking population of Trent and Bolzano. After seizing these cities, the fascists made plans to take Rome.

On 24 October 1922, the Fascist Party held its annual congress in Naples, where Mussolini ordered Blackshirts to take control of public buildings and trains and to converge on three points around Rome. The Fascists managed to seize control of several post offices and trains in northern Italy while the Italian government, led by a left-wing coalition, was internally divided and unable to respond to the Fascist advances. King Victor Emmanuel III of Italy perceived the risk of bloodshed in Rome in response to attempting to disperse the Fascists to be too high. Victor Emmanuel III decided to appoint Mussolini as Prime Minister of Italy and Mussolini arrived in Rome on 30 October to accept the appointment. Fascist propaganda aggrandized this event, known as "March on Rome", as a "seizure" of power because of Fascists' heroic exploits.

Fascist Italy 
Historian Stanley G. Payne says: "[Fascism in Italy was a] primarily political dictatorship. ... The Fascist Party itself had become almost completely bureaucratized and subservient to, not dominant over, the state itself. Big business, industry, and finance retained extensive autonomy, particularly in the early years. The armed forces also enjoyed considerable autonomy. ... The Fascist militia was placed under military control. ... The judicial system was left largely intact and relatively autonomous as well. The police continued to be directed by state officials and were not taken over by party leaders ... nor was a major new police elite created. ... There was never any question of bringing the Church under overall subservience. ... Sizable sectors of Italian cultural life retained extensive autonomy, and no major state propaganda-and-culture ministry existed. ... The Mussolini regime was neither especially sanguinary nor particularly repressive."

Mussolini in power 
Upon being appointed Prime Minister of Italy, Mussolini had to form a coalition government because the Fascists did not have control over the Italian parliament. Mussolini's coalition government initially pursued economically liberal policies under the direction of liberal finance minister Alberto De Stefani, a member of the Center Party, including balancing the budget through deep cuts to the civil service. Initially, little drastic change in government policy had occurred and repressive police actions were limited.

The Fascists began their attempt to entrench fascism in Italy with the Acerbo Law, which guaranteed a plurality of the seats in parliament to any party or coalition list in an election that received 25% or more of the vote. Through considerable Fascist violence and intimidation, the list won a majority of the vote, allowing many seats to go to the Fascists. In the aftermath of the election, a crisis and political scandal erupted after Socialist Party deputy Giacomo Matteotti was kidnapped and murdered by a Fascist. The liberals and the leftist minority in parliament walked out in protest in what became known as the Aventine Secession. On 3 January 1925, Mussolini addressed the Fascist-dominated Italian parliament and declared that he was personally responsible for what happened, but insisted that he had done nothing wrong. Mussolini proclaimed himself dictator of Italy, assuming full responsibility over the government and announcing the dismissal of parliament. From 1925 to 1929, fascism steadily became entrenched in power: opposition deputies were denied access to parliament, censorship was introduced and a December 1925 decree made Mussolini solely responsible to the King.

Catholic Church 
In 1929, the Fascist regime briefly gained what was in effect a blessing of the Catholic Church after the regime signed a concordat with the Church, known as the Lateran Treaty, which gave the papacy state sovereignty and financial compensation for the seizure of Church lands by the liberal state in the 19th century, but within two years the Church had renounced fascism in the Encyclical Non Abbiamo Bisogno as a "pagan idolatry of the state" which teaches "hatred, violence and irreverence". Not long after signing the agreement, by Mussolini's own confession, the Church had threatened to have him "excommunicated", in part because of his intractable nature, but also because he had "confiscated more issues of Catholic newspapers in the next three months than in the previous seven years." By the late 1930s, Mussolini became more vocal in his anti-clerical rhetoric, repeatedly denouncing the Catholic Church and discussing ways to depose the pope. He took the position that the "papacy was a malignant tumor in the body of Italy and must 'be rooted out once and for all,' because there was no room in Rome for both the Pope and himself." In her 1974 book, Mussolini's widow Rachele stated that her husband had always been an atheist until near the end of his life, writing that her husband was "basically irreligious until the later years of his life."

The Nazis in Germany employed similar anti-clerical policies. The Gestapo confiscated hundreds of monasteries in Austria and Germany, evicted clergymen and laymen alike and often replaced crosses with swastikas. Referring to the swastika as "the Devil's Cross", church leaders found their youth organizations banned, their meetings limited and various Catholic periodicals censored or banned. Government officials eventually found it necessary to place "Nazis into editorial positions in the Catholic press." Up to 2,720 clerics, mostly Catholics, were arrested by the Gestapo and imprisoned inside of Germany's Dachau concentration camp, resulting in over 1,000 deaths.

Corporatist economic system 
The Fascist regime created a corporatist economic system in 1925 with creation of the Palazzo Vidoni Pact, in which the Italian employers' association Confindustria and fascist trade unions agreed to recognize each other as the sole representatives of Italy's employers and employees, excluding non-fascist trade unions. The Fascist regime first created a Ministry of Corporations that organized the Italian economy into 22 sectoral corporations, banned workers' strikes and lock-outs and in 1927 created the Charter of Labour, which established workers' rights and duties and created labour tribunals to arbitrate employer-employee disputes. In practice, the sectoral corporations exercised little independence and were largely controlled by the regime, and the employee organizations were rarely led by employees themselves, but instead by appointed Fascist party members.

Aggressive foreign policy 
In the 1920s, Fascist Italy pursued an aggressive foreign policy that included an attack on the Greek island of Corfu, ambitions to expand Italian territory in the Balkans, plans to wage war against Turkey and Yugoslavia, attempts to bring Yugoslavia into civil war by supporting Croat and Macedonian separatists to legitimize Italian intervention and making Albania a de facto protectorate of Italy, which was achieved through diplomatic means by 1927. In response to revolt in the Italian colony of Libya, Fascist Italy abandoned previous liberal-era colonial policy of cooperation with local leaders. Instead, claiming that Italians were a superior race to African races and thereby had the right to colonize the "inferior" Africans, it sought to settle 10 to 15 million Italians in Libya. This resulted in an aggressive military campaign known as the Pacification of Libya against natives in Libya, including mass killings, the use of concentration camps and the forced starvation of thousands of people. Italian authorities committed ethnic cleansing by forcibly expelling 100,000 Bedouin Cyrenaicans, half the population of Cyrenaica in Libya, from their settlements that was slated to be given to Italian settlers.

Hitler adopts Italian model 

The March on Rome brought fascism international attention. One early admirer of the Italian Fascists was Adolf Hitler, who less than a month after the March had begun to model himself and the Nazi Party upon Mussolini and the Fascists. The Nazis, led by Hitler and the German war hero Erich Ludendorff, attempted a "March on Berlin" modeled upon the March on Rome, which resulted in the failed Beer Hall Putsch in Munich in November 1923.

International impact of the Great Depression and buildup to World War II 

The conditions of economic hardship caused by the Great Depression brought about an international surge of social unrest. According to historian Philip Morgan, "the onset of the Great Depression ... was the greatest stimulus yet to the diffusion and expansion of fascism outside Italy." Fascist propaganda blamed the problems of the long depression of the 1930s on minorities and scapegoats: "Judeo-Masonic-bolshevik" conspiracies, left-wing internationalism and the presence of immigrants.

In Germany, it contributed to the rise of the Nazi Party, which resulted in the demise of the Weimar Republic and the establishment of the fascist regime, Nazi Germany, under the leadership of Adolf Hitler. With the rise of Hitler and the Nazis to power in 1933, liberal democracy was dissolved in Germany and the Nazis mobilized the country for war, with expansionist territorial aims against several countries. In the 1930s, the Nazis implemented racial laws that deliberately discriminated against, disenfranchised and persecuted Jews and other racial and minority groups.

Fascist movements grew in strength elsewhere in Europe. Hungarian fascist Gyula Gömbös rose to power as Prime Minister of Hungary in 1932 and attempted to entrench his Party of National Unity throughout the country. He created an eight-hour work day and a forty-eight-hour work week in industry; sought to entrench a corporatist economy; and pursued irredentist claims on Hungary's neighbors. The fascist Iron Guard movement in Romania soared in political support after 1933, gaining representation in the Romanian government, and an Iron Guard member assassinated Romanian prime minister Ion Duca. The Iron Guard was the only fascist movement outside Germany and Italy to come to power without foreign assistance. During the 6 February 1934 crisis, France faced the greatest domestic political turmoil since the Dreyfus Affair when the fascist Francist Movement and multiple far-right movements rioted en masse in Paris against the French government resulting in major political violence. A variety of para-fascist governments that borrowed elements from fascism were formed during the Great Depression, including those of Greece, Lithuania, Poland and Yugoslavia.

In the Americas, the Brazilian Integralists led by Plínio Salgado claimed as many as 200,000 members, although following coup attempts it faced a crackdown from the Estado Novo of Getúlio Vargas in 1937. In Peru, the fascist Revolutionary Union was a fascist political party which was in power 1931 to 1933. In the 1930s, the National Socialist Movement of Chile gained seats in Chile's parliament and attempted a coup d'état that resulted in the Seguro Obrero massacre of 1938.

During the Great Depression, Mussolini promoted active state intervention in the economy. He denounced the contemporary "supercapitalism" that he claimed began in 1914 as a failure because of its alleged decadence, its support for unlimited consumerism, and its intention to create the "standardization of humankind." Fascist Italy created the Institute for Industrial Reconstruction (IRI), a giant state-owned firm and holding company that provided state funding to failing private enterprises. The IRI was made a permanent institution in Fascist Italy in 1937, pursued fascist policies to create national autarky and had the power to take over private firms to maximize war production. While Hitler's regime only nationalized 500 companies in key industries by the early 1940s, Mussolini declared in 1934 that "[t]hree-fourths of Italian economy, industrial and agricultural, is in the hands of the state." Due to the worldwide depression, Mussolini's government was able to take over most of Italy's largest failing banks, who held controlling interest in many Italian businesses. The Institute for Industrial Reconstruction, a state-operated holding company in charge of bankrupt banks and companies, reported in early 1934 that they held assets of "48.5 percent of the share capital of Italy", which later included the capital of the banks themselves. Political historian Martin Blinkhorn estimated Italy's scope of state intervention and ownership "greatly surpassed that in Nazi Germany, giving Italy a public sector second only to that of Stalin's Russia." In the late 1930s, Italy enacted manufacturing cartels, tariff barriers, currency restrictions and massive regulation of the economy to attempt to balance payments. Italy's policy of autarky failed to achieve effective economic autonomy. Nazi Germany similarly pursued an economic agenda with the aims of autarky and rearmament and imposed protectionist policies, including forcing the German steel industry to use lower-quality German iron ore rather than superior-quality imported iron.

World War II (1939–1945) 
In Fascist Italy and Nazi Germany, both Mussolini and Hitler pursued territorial expansionist and interventionist foreign policy agendas from the 1930s through the 1940s culminating in World War II. Mussolini called for irredentist Italian claims to be reclaimed, establishing Italian domination of the Mediterranean Sea and securing Italian access to the Atlantic Ocean and the creation of Italian  ("vital space") in the Mediterranean and Red Sea regions. Hitler called for irredentist German claims to be reclaimed along with the creation of German  ("living space") in Eastern Europe, including territories held by the Soviet Union, that would be colonized by Germans.

From 1935 to 1939, Germany and Italy escalated their demands for territorial claims and greater influence in world affairs. Italy invaded Ethiopia in 1935 resulting in its condemnation by the League of Nations and its widespread diplomatic isolation. In 1936, Germany remilitarized the industrial Rhineland, a region that had been ordered demilitarized by the Treaty of Versailles. In 1938, Germany annexed Austria and Italy assisted Germany in resolving the diplomatic crisis between Germany versus Britain and France over claims on Czechoslovakia by arranging the Munich Agreement that gave Germany the Sudetenland and was perceived at the time to have averted a European war. These hopes faded when Czechoslovakia was dissolved by the proclamation of the German client state of Slovakia, followed by the next day of the occupation of the remaining Czech Lands and the proclamation of the German Protectorate of Bohemia and Moravia. At the same time from 1938 to 1939, Italy was demanding territorial and colonial concessions from France and Britain. In 1939, Germany prepared for war with Poland, but attempted to gain territorial concessions from Poland through diplomatic means. The Polish government did not trust Hitler's promises and refused to accept Germany's demands.

The invasion of Poland by Germany was deemed unacceptable by Britain, France and their allies, resulting in their mutual declaration of war against Germany that was deemed the aggressor in the war in Poland, resulting in the outbreak of World War II. In 1940, Mussolini led Italy into World War II on the side of the Axis. Mussolini was aware that Italy did not have the military capacity to carry out a long war with France or the United Kingdom and waited until France was on the verge of imminent collapse and surrender from the German invasion before declaring war on France and the United Kingdom on 10 June 1940 on the assumption that the war would be short-lived following France's collapse. Mussolini believed that following a brief entry of Italy into war with France, followed by the imminent French surrender, Italy could gain some territorial concessions from France and then concentrate its forces on a major offensive in Egypt where British and Commonwealth forces were outnumbered by Italian forces. Plans by Germany to invade the United Kingdom in 1940 failed after Germany lost the aerial warfare campaign in the Battle of Britain. In 1941, the Axis campaign spread to the Soviet Union after Hitler launched Operation Barbarossa. Axis forces at the height of their power controlled almost all of continental Europe. The war became prolonged—contrary to Mussolini's plans—resulting in Italy losing battles on multiple fronts and requiring German assistance.

During World War II, the Axis Powers in Europe led by Nazi Germany participated in the extermination of millions of Poles, Jews, Gypsies and others in the genocide known as the Holocaust.
After 1942, Axis forces began to falter. In 1943, after Italy faced multiple military failures, the complete reliance and subordination of Italy to Germany, the Allied invasion of Italy and the corresponding international humiliation, Mussolini was removed as head of government and arrested on the order of King Victor Emmanuel III, who proceeded to dismantle the Fascist state and declared Italy's switching of allegiance to the Allied side. Mussolini was rescued from arrest by German forces and led the German client state, the Italian Social Republic from 1943 to 1945. Nazi Germany faced multiple losses and steady Soviet and Western Allied offensives from 1943 to 1945.

On 28 April 1945, Mussolini was captured and executed by Italian communist partisans. On 30 April 1945, Hitler committed suicide. Shortly afterwards, Germany surrendered and the Nazi regime was systematically dismantled by the occupying Allied powers. An International Military Tribunal was subsequently convened in Nuremberg. Beginning in November 1945 and lasting through 1949, numerous Nazi political, military and economic leaders were tried and convicted of war crimes, with many of the worst offenders being sentenced to death and executed.

Post-World War II (1945–2008) 

The victory of the Allies over the Axis powers in World War II led to the collapse of many fascist regimes in Europe. The Nuremberg Trials convicted several Nazi leaders of crimes against humanity involving the Holocaust. However, there remained several movements and governments that were ideologically related to fascism.

Francisco Franco's Falangist one-party state in Spain was officially neutral during World War II and it survived the collapse of the Axis Powers. Franco's rise to power had been directly assisted by the militaries of Fascist Italy and Nazi Germany during the Spanish Civil War and Franco had sent volunteers to fight on the side of Nazi Germany against the Soviet Union during World War II. The first years were characterized by a repression against the anti-fascist ideologies, deep censorship and the suppression of democratic institutions (elected Parliament, Spanish Constitution of 1931, Regional Statutes of Autonomy). After World War II and a period of international isolation, Franco's regime normalized relations with the Western powers during the Cold War, until Franco's death in 1975 and the transformation of Spain into a liberal democracy.

Historian Robert Paxton observes that one of the main problems in defining fascism is that it was widely mimicked. Paxton says: "In fascism's heyday, in the 1930s, many regimes that were not functionally fascist borrowed elements of fascist decor in order to lend themselves an aura of force, vitality, and mass mobilization." He goes on to observe that Salazar "crushed Portuguese fascism after he had copied some of its techniques of popular mobilization." Paxton says: "Where Franco subjected Spain's fascist party to his personal control, Salazar abolished outright in July 1934 the nearest thing Portugal had to an authentic fascist movement, Rolão Preto's blue-shirted National Syndicalists. ... Salazar preferred to control his population through such 'organic' institutions traditionally powerful in Portugal as the Church. Salazar's regime was not only non-fascist, but 'voluntarily non-totalitarian,' preferring to let those of its citizens who kept out of politics 'live by habit. However, historians tend to view the Estado Novo as para-fascist in nature, possessing minimal fascist tendencies. Other historians, including Fernando Rosas and Manuel Villaverde Cabral, think that the Estado Novo should be considered fascist.

In Argentina, Peronism, associated with the regime of Juan Perón from 1946 to 1955 and 1973 to 1974, was influenced by fascism. Between 1939 and 1941, prior to his rise to power, Perón had developed a deep admiration of Italian Fascism and modelled his economic policies on Italian fascist policies. However, not all historians agree with this identification, which they consider debatable or even false, biased by a pejorative political position. Other authors, such as the Israeli Raanan Rein, categorically maintain that Perón was not a fascist and that this characterization was imposed on him because of his defiant stance against US hegemony.

The term neo-fascism refers to fascist movements after World War II. In Italy, the Italian Social Movement led by Giorgio Almirante was a major neo-fascist movement that transformed itself into a self-described "post-fascist" movement called the National Alliance (AN), which has been an ally of Silvio Berlusconi's Forza Italia for a decade. In 2008, AN joined Forza Italia in Berlusconi's new party The People of Freedom, but in 2012 a group of politicians split from The People of Freedom, refounding the party with the name Brothers of Italy. In Germany, various neo-Nazi movements have been formed and banned in accordance with Germany's constitutional law which forbids Nazism. The National Democratic Party of Germany (NPD) is widely considered a neo-Nazi party, although the party does not publicly identify itself as such.

Contemporary fascism (2008–present)

Greece 

After the onset of the Great Recession and economic crisis in Greece, a movement known as the Golden Dawn, widely considered a neo-Nazi party, soared in support out of obscurity and won seats in Greece's parliament, espousing a staunch hostility towards minorities, illegal immigrants and refugees. In 2013, after the murder of an anti-fascist musician by a person with links to Golden Dawn, the Greek government ordered the arrest of Golden Dawn's leader Nikolaos Michaloliakos and other members on charges related to being associated with a criminal organization. On 7 October 2020, Athens Appeals Court announced verdicts for 68 defendants, including the party's political leadership. Nikolaos Michaloliakos and six other prominent members and former MPs were found guilty of running a criminal organization. Guilty verdicts on charges of murder, attempted murder, and violent attacks on immigrants and left-wing political opponents were delivered.

Post-Soviet Russia 

Marlene Laruelle, a French political scientist, contends in Is Russia Fascist? that the accusation of "fascist" has evolved into a strategic narrative of the existing world order. Geopolitical rivals might construct their own view of the world and assert the moral high ground by branding ideological rivals as fascists, regardless of their real ideals or deeds. Laruelle discusses the basis, significance, and veracity of accusations of fascism in and around Russia through an analysis of the domestic situation in Russia and the Kremlin's foreign policy justifications; she concludes that Russian efforts to brand its opponents as fascist is ultimately an attempt to determine the future of Russia in Europe as an antifascist force, influenced by its role in fighting fascism in World War II.

According to Alexander J. Motyl, an American historian and political scientist, Russian fascism has the following characteristics:

 An undemocratic political system, different from both traditional authoritarianism and totalitarianism;
 Statism and hypernationalism;
 A hypermasculine cult of the supreme leader (emphasis on his courage, militancy and physical prowess);
 General popular support for the regime and its leader.

Yale historian Timothy Snyder has stated that "Putin's regime is [...] the world center of fascism" and has written an article entitled "We Should Say It: Russia Is Fascist." Oxford historian Roger Griffin compared Putin's Russia to the World War II-era Empire of Japan, saying that like Putin's Russia, it "emulated fascism in many ways, but was not fascist." Historian Stanley G. Payne says Putin's Russia "is not equivalent to the fascist regimes of World War II, but it forms the nearest analogue to fascism found in a major country since that time" and argues that that Putin's political system is "more a revival of the creed of Tsar Nicholas I in the 19th century that emphasized 'Orthodoxy, autocracy, and nationality' than one resembling the revolutionary, modernizing regimes of Hitler and Mussolini." According to Griffin fascism is "a revolutionary form of nationalism" seeking to destroy the old system and remake society, and that Putin is a reactionary politician who is not trying to create a new order "but to recreate a modified version of the Soviet Union". German political scientist Andreas Umland said genuine fascists in Russia, like deceased politician Vladimir Zhirinovsky and activist and self-styled philosopher Aleksandr Dugin, "describe in their writings a completely new Russia" controlling parts of the world that were never under tsarist or Soviet domination. According to Marlene Laurelle writing in The Washington Quarterly, "applying the “fascism” label ... to the entirety of the Russian state or society short-circuits our ability to construct a more complex and differentiated picture.

Radio Free Europe/Radio Liberty, collecting the opinions of experts on fascism, said that while Russia is repressive and authoritarian, it cannot be classified as a fascist state for various reasons, including Russia's government being more reactionary than revolutionary.

Tenets 
Robert O. Paxton finds that even though fascism "maintained the existing regime of property and social hierarchy," it cannot be considered "simply a more muscular form of conservatism" because "fascism in power did carry out some changes profound enough to be called 'revolutionary. These transformations "often set fascists into conflict with conservatives rooted in families, churches, social rank, and property." Paxton argues that "fascism redrew the frontiers between private and public, sharply diminishing what had once been untouchably private. It changed the practice of citizenship from the enjoyment of constitutional rights and duties to participation in mass ceremonies of affirmation and conformity. It reconfigured relations between the individual and the collectivity, so that an individual had no rights outside community interest. It expanded the powers of the executive—party and state—in a bid for total control. Finally, it unleashed aggressive emotions hitherto known in Europe only during war or social revolution."

Nationalism with or without expansionism 

Ultranationalism, combined with the myth of national rebirth, is a key foundation of fascism. Robert Paxton argues that "a passionate nationalism" is the basis of fascism, combined with "a conspiratorial and Manichean view of history" which holds that "the chosen people have been weakened by political parties, social classes, unassimilable minorities, spoiled rentiers, and rationalist thinkers." Roger Griffin identifies the core of fascism as being palingenetic ultranationalism.

The fascist view of a nation is of a single organic entity that binds people together by their ancestry and is a natural unifying force of people. Fascism seeks to solve economic, political and social problems by achieving a millenarian national rebirth, exalting the nation or race above all else and promoting cults of unity, strength and purity. European fascist movements typically espouse a racist conception of non-Europeans being inferior to Europeans. Beyond this, fascists in Europe have not held a unified set of racial views. Historically, most fascists promoted imperialism, although there have been several fascist movements that were uninterested in the pursuit of new imperial ambitions. For example, Nazism and Italian Fascism were expansionist and irredentist. Falangism in Spain envisioned the worldwide unification of Spanish-speaking peoples (Hispanidad). British Fascism was non-interventionist, though it did embrace the British Empire.

Totalitarianism 
Fascism promotes the establishment of a totalitarian state. It opposes liberal democracy, rejects multi-party systems, and may support a one-party state so that it may synthesize with the nation. Mussolini's The Doctrine of Fascism (1932), partly ghostwritten by philosopher Giovanni Gentile, who Mussolini described as "the philosopher of Fascism", states: "The Fascist conception of the State is all-embracing; outside of it no human or spiritual values can exist, much less have value. Thus understood, Fascism is totalitarian, and the Fascist State—a synthesis and a unit inclusive of all values—interprets, develops, and potentiates the whole life of a people." In The Legal Basis of the Total State, Nazi political theorist Carl Schmitt described the Nazi intention to form a "strong state which guarantees a totality of political unity transcending all diversity" in order to avoid a "disastrous pluralism tearing the German people apart."

Fascist states pursued policies of social indoctrination through propaganda in education and the media, and regulation of the production of educational and media materials. Education was designed to glorify the fascist movement and inform students of its historical and political importance to the nation. It attempted to purge ideas that were not consistent with the beliefs of the fascist movement and to teach students to be obedient to the state.

Economy 

Fascism presented itself as an alternative to both international socialism and free-market capitalism. While fascism opposed mainstream socialism, fascists sometimes regarded their movement as a type of nationalist "socialism" to highlight their commitment to nationalism, describing it as national solidarity and unity. Fascists opposed international free market capitalism, but supported a type of productive capitalism. Economic self-sufficiency, known as autarky, was a major goal of most fascist governments.

Fascist governments advocated for the resolution of domestic class conflict within a nation in order to guarantee national unity. This would be done through the state mediating relations between the classes (contrary to the views of classical liberal-inspired capitalists). While fascism was opposed to domestic class conflict, it was held that bourgeois-proletarian conflict existed primarily in national conflict between proletarian nations versus bourgeois nations. Fascism condemned what it viewed as widespread character traits that it associated as the typical bourgeois mentality that it opposed, such as: materialism, crassness, cowardice, and the inability to comprehend the heroic ideal of the fascist "warrior"; and associations with liberalism, individualism and parliamentarianism. In 1918, Mussolini defined what he viewed as the proletarian character, defining proletarian as being one and the same with producers, a productivist perspective that associated all people deemed productive, including entrepreneurs, technicians, workers and soldiers as being proletarian. He acknowledged the historical existence of both bourgeois and proletarian producers but declared the need for bourgeois producers to merge with proletarian producers.

Because productivism was key to creating a strong nationalist state, it criticized internationalist and Marxist socialism, advocating instead to represent a type of nationalist productivist socialism. Nevertheless, while condemning parasitical capitalism, was willing to accommodate productivist capitalism within it so long as it supported the nationalist objective. The role of productivism was derived from Henri de Saint Simon, whose ideas inspired the creation of utopian socialism and influenced other ideologies, that stressed solidarity rather than class war and whose conception of productive people in the economy included both productive workers and productive bosses to challenge the influence of the aristocracy and unproductive financial speculators. Saint Simon's vision combined the traditionalist right-wing criticisms of the French Revolution with a left-wing belief in the need for association or collaboration of productive people in society. Whereas Marxism condemned capitalism as a system of exploitative property relations, fascism saw the nature of the control of credit and money in the contemporary capitalist system as abusive. Unlike Marxism, fascism did not see class conflict between the Marxist-defined proletariat and the bourgeoisie as a given or as an engine of historical materialism. Instead, it viewed workers and productive capitalists in common as productive people who were in conflict with parasitic elements in society including: corrupt political parties, corrupt financial capital and feeble people. Fascist leaders such as Mussolini and Hitler spoke of the need to create a new managerial elite led by engineers and captains of industry—but free from the parasitic leadership of industries. Hitler stated that the Nazi Party supported  ("productive capitalism") that was based upon profit earned from one's own labour, but condemned unproductive capitalism or loan capitalism, which derived profit from speculation.

Fascist economics supported a state-controlled economy that accepted a mix of private and public ownership over the means of production. Economic planning was applied to both the public and private sector and the prosperity of private enterprise depended on its acceptance of synchronizing itself with the economic goals of the state. Fascist economic ideology supported the profit motive, but emphasized that industries must uphold the national interest as superior to private profit.

While fascism accepted the importance of material wealth and power, it condemned materialism which identified as being present in both communism and capitalism and criticized materialism for lacking acknowledgement of the role of the spirit. In particular, fascists criticized capitalism, not because of its competitive nature nor support of private property, which fascists supported—but due to its materialism, individualism, alleged bourgeois decadence and alleged indifference to the nation. Fascism denounced Marxism for its advocacy of materialist internationalist class identity, which fascists regarded as an attack upon the emotional and spiritual bonds of the nation and a threat to the achievement of genuine national solidarity.

In discussing the spread of fascism beyond Italy, historian Philip Morgan states: "Since the Depression was a crisis of laissez-faire capitalism and its political counterpart, parliamentary democracy, fascism could pose as the 'third-way' alternative between capitalism and Bolshevism, the model of a new European 'civilization.' As Mussolini typically put it in early 1934, 'from 1929 ... fascism has become a universal phenomenon ... The dominant forces of the 19th century, democracy, socialism, [and] liberalism have been exhausted ... the new political and economic forms of the twentieth-century are fascist' (Mussolini 1935: 32)."

Fascists criticized egalitarianism as preserving the weak, and they instead promoted social Darwinist views and policies. They were in principle opposed to the idea of social welfare, arguing that it "encouraged the preservation of the degenerate and the feeble." The Nazi Party condemned the welfare system of the Weimar Republic, as well as private charity and philanthropy, for supporting people whom they regarded as racially inferior and weak, and who should have been weeded out in the process of natural selection. Nevertheless, faced with the mass unemployment and poverty of the Great Depression, the Nazis found it necessary to set up charitable institutions to help racially-pure Germans in order to maintain popular support, while arguing that this represented "racial self-help" and not indiscriminate charity or universal social welfare. Thus, Nazi programs such as the Winter Relief of the German People and the broader National Socialist People's Welfare (NSV) were organized as quasi-private institutions, officially relying on private donations from Germans to help others of their race—although in practice those who refused to donate could face severe consequences. Unlike the social welfare institutions of the Weimar Republic and the Christian charities, the NSV distributed assistance on explicitly racial grounds. It provided support only to those who were "racially sound, capable of and willing to work, politically reliable, and willing and able to reproduce." Non-Aryans were excluded, as well as the "work-shy", "asocials" and the "hereditarily ill". Under these conditions, by 1939, over 17 million Germans had obtained assistance from the NSV, and the agency "projected a powerful image of caring and support" for "those who were judged to have got into difficulties through no fault of their own." Yet the organization was "feared and disliked among society's poorest" because it resorted to intrusive questioning and monitoring to judge who was worthy of support.

Action 
Fascism emphasizes direct action, including supporting the legitimacy of political violence, as a core part of its politics. Fascism views violent action as a necessity in politics that fascism identifies as being an "endless struggle"; this emphasis on the use of political violence means that most fascist parties have also created their own private militias (e.g. the Nazi Party's Brown shirts and Fascist Italy's Blackshirts).

The basis of fascism's support of violent action in politics is connected to social Darwinism. Fascist movements have commonly held social Darwinist views of nations, races and societies. They say that nations and races must purge themselves of socially and biologically weak or degenerate people, while simultaneously promoting the creation of strong people, in order to survive in a world defined by perpetual national and racial conflict.

Age and gender roles 

Fascism emphasizes youth both in a physical sense of age and in a spiritual sense as related to virility and commitment to action. The Italian Fascists' political anthem was called Giovinezza ("The Youth"). Fascism identifies the physical age period of youth as a critical time for the moral development of people who will affect society. Walter Laqueur argues that "[t]he corollaries of the cult of war and physical danger were the cult of brutality, strength, and sexuality ... [fascism is] a true counter-civilization: rejecting the sophisticated rationalist humanism of Old Europe, fascism sets up as its ideal the primitive instincts and primal emotions of the barbarian."

Italian Fascism pursued what it called "moral hygiene" of youth, particularly regarding sexuality. Fascist Italy promoted what it considered normal sexual behaviour in youth while denouncing what it considered deviant sexual behaviour. It condemned pornography, most forms of birth control and contraceptive devices (with the exception of the condom), homosexuality and prostitution as deviant sexual behaviour, although enforcement of laws opposed to such practices was erratic and authorities often turned a blind eye. Fascist Italy regarded the promotion of male sexual excitation before puberty as the cause of criminality amongst male youth, declared homosexuality a social disease and pursued an aggressive campaign to reduce prostitution of young women.

Mussolini perceived women's primary role as primarily child bearers, while that of men as warriors, once saying: "War is to man what maternity is to the woman." In an effort to increase birthrates, the Italian Fascist government gave financial incentives to women who raised large families and initiated policies intended to reduce the number of women employed. Italian Fascism called for women to be honoured as "reproducers of the nation" and the Italian Fascist government held ritual ceremonies to honour women's role within the Italian nation. In 1934, Mussolini declared that employment of women was a "major aspect of the thorny problem of unemployment" and that for women, working was "incompatible with childbearing"; Mussolini went on to say that the solution to unemployment for men was the "exodus of women from the work force."

The German Nazi government strongly encouraged women to stay at home to bear children and keep house. This policy was reinforced by bestowing the Cross of Honor of the German Mother on women bearing four or more children. The unemployment rate was cut substantially, mostly through arms production and sending women home so that men could take their jobs. Nazi propaganda sometimes promoted premarital and extramarital sexual relations, unwed motherhood and divorce, but at other times the Nazis opposed such behaviour.

The Nazis decriminalized abortion in cases where fetuses had hereditary defects or were of a race the government disapproved of, while the abortion of healthy pure German, Aryan fetuses remained strictly forbidden. For non-Aryans, abortion was often compulsory. Their eugenics program also stemmed from the "progressive biomedical model" of Weimar Germany. In 1935, Nazi Germany expanded the legality of abortion by amending its eugenics law, to promote abortion for women with hereditary disorders. The law allowed abortion if a woman gave her permission and the fetus was not yet viable and for purposes of so-called racial hygiene.

The Nazis said that homosexuality was degenerate, effeminate, perverted and undermined masculinity because it did not produce children. They considered homosexuality curable through therapy, citing modern scientism and the study of sexology, which said that homosexuality could be felt by "normal" people and not just an abnormal minority. Open homosexuals were interned in Nazi concentration camps.

Palingenesis and modernism 
Fascism emphasizes both palingenesis (national rebirth or re-creation) and modernism. In particular, fascism's nationalism has been identified as having a palingenetic character. Fascism promotes the regeneration of the nation and purging it of decadence. Fascism accepts forms of modernism that it deems promotes national regeneration while rejecting forms of modernism that are regarded as antithetical to national regeneration. Fascism aestheticized modern technology and its association with speed, power and violence. Fascism admired advances in the economy in the early 20th century, particularly Fordism and scientific management. Fascist modernism has been recognized as inspired or developed by various figures—such as Filippo Tommaso Marinetti, Ernst Jünger, Gottfried Benn, Louis-Ferdinand Céline, Knut Hamsun, Ezra Pound and Wyndham Lewis.

In Italy, such modernist influence was exemplified by Marinetti who advocated a palingenetic modernist society that condemned liberal-bourgeois values of tradition and psychology, while promoting a technological-martial religion of national renewal that emphasized militant nationalism. In Germany, it was exemplified by Jünger who was influenced by his observation of the technological warfare during World War I and claimed that a new social class had been created that he described as the "warrior-worker"; Like Marinetti, Jünger emphasized the revolutionary capacities of technology. He emphasized an "organic construction" between human and machine as a liberating and regenerative force that challenged liberal democracy, conceptions of individual autonomy, bourgeois nihilism and decadence. He conceived of a society based on a totalitarian concept of "total mobilization" of such disciplined warrior-workers.

Fascist aesthetics 
According to cultural critic Susan Sontag, "[f]ascist aesthetics ... flow from (and justify) a preoccupation with situations of control, submissive behavior, extravagant effort, and the endurance of pain; they endorse two seemingly opposite states, egomania and servitude. The relations of domination and enslavement take the form of a characteristic pageantry: the massing of groups of people; the turning of people into things; the multiplication or replication of things; and the grouping of people/things around an all-powerful, hypnotic leader-figure or force. The fascist dramaturgy centers on the orgiastic transactions between mighty forces and their puppets, uniformly garbed and shown in ever swelling numbers. Its choreography alternates between ceaseless motion and a congealed, static, 'virile' posing. Fascist art glorifies surrender, it exalts mindlessness, it glamorizes death." Sontag also enumerates some commonalities between fascist art and the official art of communist countries, such as the obeisance of the masses to the hero, and a preference for the monumental and the "grandiose and rigid" choreography of mass bodies. But whereas official communist art "aims to expound and reinforce a utopian morality", the art of fascist countries such as Nazi Germany "displays a utopian aesthetics – that of physical perfection", in a way that is "both prurient and idealizing".

According to Sontag, fascist aesthetics "is based on the containment of vital forces; movements are confined, held tight, held in." Its appeal is not necessarily limited to those who share the fascist political ideology because fascism "stands for an ideal or rather ideals that are persistent today under the other banners: the ideal of life as art, the cult of beauty, the fetishism of courage, the dissolution of alienation in ecstatic feelings of community; the repudiation of the intellect; the family of man (under the parenthood of leaders)."

Criticism 
Fascism has been widely criticized and condemned in modern times since the defeat of the Axis powers in World War II.

Anti-democratic and tyrannical 

One of the most common and strongest criticisms of fascism is that it is a tyranny. Fascism is deliberately and entirely non-democratic and anti-democratic.

Unprincipled opportunism 
Some critics of Italian fascism have said that much of the ideology was merely a by-product of unprincipled opportunism by Mussolini and that he changed his political stances merely to bolster his personal ambitions while he disguised them as being purposeful to the public. Richard Washburn Child, the American ambassador to Italy who worked with Mussolini and became his friend and admirer, defended Mussolini's opportunistic behaviour by writing: "Opportunist is a term of reproach used to brand men who fit themselves to conditions for the reasons of self-interest. Mussolini, as I have learned to know him, is an opportunist in the sense that he believed that mankind itself must be fitted to changing conditions rather than to fixed theories, no matter how many hopes and prayers have been expended on theories and programmes." Child quoted Mussolini as saying: "The sanctity of an ism is not in the ism; it has no sanctity beyond its power to do, to work, to succeed in practice. It may have succeeded yesterday and fail to-morrow. Failed yesterday and succeed to-morrow. The machine, first of all, must run!"

Some have criticized Mussolini's actions during the outbreak of World War I as opportunistic for seeming to suddenly abandon Marxist egalitarian internationalism for non-egalitarian nationalism and note, to that effect, that upon Mussolini endorsing Italy's intervention in the war against Germany and Austria-Hungary, he and the new fascist movement received financial support from Italian and foreign sources, such as Ansaldo (an armaments firm) and other companies as well as the British Security Service MI5. Some, including Mussolini's socialist opponents at the time, have noted that regardless of the financial support he accepted for his pro-interventionist stance, Mussolini was free to write whatever he wished in his newspaper  without prior sanctioning from his financial backers. Furthermore, the major source of financial support that Mussolini and the fascist movement received in World War I was from France and is widely believed to have been French socialists who supported the French government's war against Germany and who sent support to Italian socialists who wanted Italian intervention on France's side.

Mussolini's transformation away from Marxism into what eventually became fascism began prior to World War I, as Mussolini had grown increasingly pessimistic about Marxism and egalitarianism while becoming increasingly supportive of figures who opposed egalitarianism, such as Friedrich Nietzsche. By 1902, Mussolini was studying Georges Sorel, Nietzsche and Vilfredo Pareto. Sorel's emphasis on the need for overthrowing decadent liberal democracy and capitalism by the use of violence, direct action, general strikes and neo-Machiavellian appeals to emotion impressed Mussolini deeply. Mussolini's use of Nietzsche made him a highly unorthodox socialist, due to Nietzsche's promotion of elitism and anti-egalitarian views. Prior to World War I, Mussolini's writings over time indicated that he had abandoned the Marxism and egalitarianism that he had previously supported in favour of Nietzsche's  concept and anti-egalitarianism. In 1908, Mussolini wrote a short essay called "Philosophy of Strength" based on his Nietzschean influence, in which Mussolini openly spoke fondly of the ramifications of an impending war in Europe in challenging both religion and nihilism: "[A] new kind of free spirit will come, strengthened by the war, ... a spirit equipped with a kind of sublime perversity, ... a new free spirit will triumph over God and over Nothing."

Ideological dishonesty 
Fascism has been criticized for being ideologically dishonest. Major examples of ideological dishonesty have been identified in Italian fascism's changing relationship with German Nazism. Fascist Italy's official foreign policy positions commonly used rhetorical ideological hyperbole to justify its actions, although during Dino Grandi's tenure as Italy's foreign minister the country engaged in  free of such fascist hyperbole. Italian fascism's stance towards German Nazism fluctuated from support from the late 1920s to 1934, when it celebrated Hitler's rise to power and Mussolini's first meeting with Hitler in 1934; to opposition from 1934 to 1936 after the assassination of Italy's allied leader in Austria, Engelbert Dollfuss, by Austrian Nazis; and again back to support after 1936, when Germany was the only significant power that did not denounce Italy's invasion and occupation of Ethiopia.

After antagonism exploded between Nazi Germany and Fascist Italy over the assassination of Austrian Chancellor Dollfuss in 1934, Mussolini and Italian fascists denounced and ridiculed Nazism's racial theories, particularly by denouncing its Nordicism, while promoting Mediterraneanism. Mussolini himself responded to Nordicists' claims of Italy being divided into Nordic and Mediterranean racial areas due to Germanic invasions of Northern Italy by claiming that while Germanic tribes such as the Lombards took control of Italy after the fall of Ancient Rome, they arrived in small numbers (about 8,000) and quickly assimilated into Roman culture and spoke the Latin language within fifty years. Italian fascism was influenced by the tradition of Italian nationalists scornfully looking down upon Nordicists' claims and taking pride in comparing the age and sophistication of ancient Roman civilization as well as the classical revival in the Renaissance to that of Nordic societies that Italian nationalists described as "newcomers" to civilization in comparison. At the height of antagonism between the Nazis and Italian fascists over race, Mussolini claimed that the Germans themselves were not a pure race and noted with irony that the Nazi theory of German racial superiority was based on the theories of non-German foreigners, such as Frenchman Arthur de Gobineau. After the tension in German-Italian relations diminished during the late 1930s, Italian fascism sought to harmonize its ideology with German Nazism and combined Nordicist and Mediterranean racial theories, noting that Italians were members of the Aryan Race, composed of a mixed Nordic-Mediterranean subtype.

In 1938, Mussolini declared upon Italy's adoption of antisemitic laws that Italian fascism had always been antisemitic. In fact, Italian fascism did not endorse antisemitism until the late 1930s when Mussolini feared alienating antisemitic Nazi Germany, whose power and influence were growing in Europe. Prior to that period, there had been notable Jewish Italians who had been senior Italian fascist officials, including Margherita Sarfatti, who had also been Mussolini's mistress. Also contrary to Mussolini's claim in 1938, only a small number of Italian fascists were staunchly antisemitic (such as Roberto Farinacci and Giuseppe Preziosi), while others such as Italo Balbo, who came from Ferrara which had one of Italy's largest Jewish communities, were disgusted by the antisemitic laws and opposed them. Fascism scholar Mark Neocleous notes that while Italian fascism did not have a clear commitment to antisemitism, there were occasional antisemitic statements issued prior to 1938, such as Mussolini in 1919 declaring that the Jewish bankers in London and New York were connected by race to the Russian Bolsheviks and that eight percent of the Russian Bolsheviks were Jews.

In popular culture 
American folksinger and songwriter Woody Guthrie is quoted by fellow singer and songwriter Pete Seeger as having said: "Fascism comes along when the rich people get the generals to help them stay in power." Seeger himself remarked that "The first country a fascist dictator conquers is his own country. Then he aims at other countries."

See also 

 Christian fascism
 Clerical fascism
 Conservative Revolution
 Crypto-fascism
 Fascism in South America

 Islamofascism
 Neo-Nazism
 Pact of Pacification
 Proto-fascism
 Rashism

 Right-wing authoritarianism
 Reactionary modernism
 Squadrismo
 Statism in Shōwa Japan
 Strongman (politics)

References 
Notes

Bibliography
Primary sources

 
 
 
 
 
 . Supplement, Papers and Proceedings of the Forty-Seventh Annual Meeting of the American Economic Association.
 
 
 
 
 
 
 
 
 , republished in 
 ; link via The Orwell Foundation
 

Secondary sources

 
 
 
 
 
 

 
  
 
 
 
 
 
 
 
 
 
 
 
 
 
 
 

 
 
 
  
 
 
  
 

 
 
 
 
 
 
 
 
 
 

 
 
 
 

 
 
 
 

 
 
 
 
 
 
 
 
 
 
 
 
 
 
 
 
 
 
 
 
 
 

 
 
 
 
 
 
 
 

 

 
 
 
 
 
 
 
 
 
 
 
 

 
 
 
 
 
 
 
 

 
 
 
 
 
  online review.
 
 
 
  Originally published by William Morrow in 1974.

 
 
 

 
 
 

 
 
 
 
 
 
 
 
  online; also another copy.
  online.
 
 
 

 
 

 
 
 
 
 
 
 
 
 

 
 
 
 
 
 
 
 
 
 
 
 
 
 
 

 
 
 
 

 
 

  Contains chapters on fascist movements in different countries.
 
 
 
 
 
 
 
 
 
 

 
 

Tertiary sources

 
 
 
 
 

Further reading

External links 

 The Doctrine of Fascism by Benito Mussolini (1932) 
 Authorized translation of Mussolini's "The Political and Social Doctrine of Fascism" (1933) (PDF). media.wix.com.
 Readings on Fascism and National Socialism by Various – Project Gutenberg
 "Eternal Fascism: Fourteen Ways of Looking at a Blackshirt" – Umberto Eco's list of 14 characteristics of Fascism, originally published 1995.

Fascism
Authoritarianism
Anti-communism
Corporatism
Dictatorship
Economic ideologies
Far-right politics
Italian words and phrases
Political ideologies
Political science terminology
Political systems
Populism
Right-wing ideologies
Right-wing populism
Syncretic political movements
Totalitarianism